Dylan Smith may refer to:

Dylan Smith (actor)
Dylan Smith (businessman) (born 1985), co-founder and CFO of Box
Dylan Smith (Australian rules footballer) (born 1982), former Australian rules footballer
Dylan Smith (soccer) (born 1996), Australian association footballer
Dylan Smith (rugby union) (born 1994), South African rugby union player
Dylan Smith (Scottish footballer) (born 2006), Scottish footballer
Dylan Smith (baseball)